Alexander Jardine (October 17, 1874 – February 22, 1949) was a fireman first class serving in the United States Navy during the Spanish–American War who received the Medal of Honor for bravery.

Biography
Jardine was born October 17, 1874, in Inverness, Scotland and after entering the navy he was sent to fight in the Spanish–American War aboard the U.S.S. Potomac as a Fireman First Class.

He died February 22, 1949, and was buried at Arlington National Cemetery Arlington, Virginia.

Medal of Honor citation
Rank and organization: Fireman First Class, U.S. Navy. Born: 19 March 1873, Inverness, Scotland. Accredited to: Ohio. G.O. No.: 503, 13 December 1898.

Citation:

On board the U.S.S. Potomac during the passage of that vessel from Cat Island to Nassau, 14 November 1898. Volunteering to enter the fireroom which was filled with steam, Jardine, after repeated attempts, succeeded in reaching the auxiliary valve and opening it, thereby relieving the vessel from further danger.

See also

 List of Medal of Honor recipients for the Spanish–American War

References

External links
 
 John Alexander Jardine at ArlingtonCemetery.net, an unofficial website
 

1874 births
1949 deaths
United States Navy Medal of Honor recipients
United States Navy sailors
American military personnel of the Spanish–American War
Scottish-born Medal of Honor recipients
Scottish emigrants to the United States
Burials at Arlington National Cemetery
Spanish–American War recipients of the Medal of Honor